Gerd Saborowski (born 3 September 1943) is a German former professional footballer played as a striker. He spent five seasons in the Bundesliga with Eintracht Braunschweig.

Honours
Eintracht Braunschweig
 Bundesliga: 1966–67

References

External links
 

1943 births
Living people
German footballers
Association football forwards
Germany under-21 international footballers
Bundesliga players
Holstein Kiel players
Eintracht Braunschweig players
People from the Province of Pomerania
Sportspeople from Pomeranian Voivodeship
West German footballers